The Tuscaloosa Toyota Classic is a tournament on the Epson Tour, the LPGA's developmental tour. It has been a part of the tour's schedule since 2022. 

The tournament is held at the Ol' Colony Golf Course in Tuscaloosa, Alabama. Celine Borge of Norway won the inaugural event for her first Epson Tour title.

Winners

References

External links

Coverage on Epson Tour website

Symetra Tour events
Golf in Alabama
Recurring sporting events established in 2022
2022 establishments in Alabama